Apostolos "Lakis" Papaioannou (Greek: Απόστολος "Λάκης" Παπαϊωάννου; born 5 October 1956) is a retired Greek professional footballer who played as a midfielder.

Career

Club career
Born in Katerini, Papaioannou began playing football with the youth sides of A.O. Katerinis and Pierikos F.C. In 1973, he made his senior debut for Pierikos in the Beta Ethniki. Papaioannou helped Pierikos to gain its promotion to the Alpha Ethniki in 1975, and played for the club until 1979 when it was relegated to the regional leagues. Alpha Ethniki side Iraklis Thessaloniki F.C. signed Papaioannou in 1979, and would play for Iraklis until city rivals PAOK F.C. signed him in 1986.

Papaioannou helped PAOK to consecutive second-place finishes in the league, and then joined PAS Giannina F.C. in 1988. His finished his career with Patras F.C., retiring in 1992. All told, Papaioannou made over 500 appearances in the Greek first and second divisions.

International
Papaioannou made 38 appearances and scored two goals for the Greece national football team from 1977 to 1987. He made his debut as a second-half substitute in a 6–1 friendly defeat to Romania on 21 September 1977.

Post retirement
After he retired from playing, Papaioannou became a football scout. He led the scouting and recruiting efforts for Arsenal F.C.'s new elite football academy in Loutraki.

Personal life
Lakis Papaioannou is married to Konstantina Tarantzopoulou or otherwise Dina Papaioannou, a performer in northern Greece. His daughter, Eleana, is a pop singer.

References

External links

1956 births
Living people
Greek footballers
Greece international footballers
Pierikos F.C. players
Iraklis Thessaloniki F.C. players
PAOK FC players
Footballers from Katerini
PAS Giannina F.C. players
Super League Greece players
Association football midfielders
A.O. Kerkyra managers